State Highway 44 (Andhra Pradesh) is a state highway in the Indian state of Andhra Pradesh It passes from North to South.

Route 

It starts at SH 42 junction at Jangareddygudem and passes through Kamavarapukota, Tadikalapudi and ends at Eluru.
This highway is being upgraded into 4 Lane.

Junctions and interchanges

See also 
 List of State Highways in Andhra Pradesh

References 

Transport in Eluru
State Highways in Andhra Pradesh
Roads in West Godavari district